The 1931 Princeton Tigers football team was an American football team that represented Princeton University as an independent during the 1931 college football season. In their first and only season under head coach Albert Wittmer, the Tigers finished with a 1–7 record and were outscored by a total of 164 to 55. 

End William H. Yeckley was elected as the team captain. No Princeton players were selected as first-team honorees on the 1931 College Football All-America Team.

Wittmer resigned as Princeton's head football coach on December 19, 1931. He retained his post the school's head basketball coach.

Schedule

References

Princeton
Princeton Tigers football seasons
Princeton Tigers football